The 2009 Segunda División B play-offs (Playoffs de Ascenso or Promoción de Ascenso) were the final playoffs for promotion from 2008–09 Segunda División B to the 2009–10 Segunda División. The four first placed teams in each of the four Segunda División B groups played the Playoffs de Ascenso and the four last placed teams in Segunda División were relegated to Segunda División B. It also decided the two teams which placed 16th to be relegated to the 2009–10 Tercera División.

New Format
Starting with the 2008–09 season, the four group winners had the opportunity to promote directly and become the overall Segunda División B champion. The four group winners were drawn into a two-legged series where the two winners promoted to the Liga Adelante and entered into the final for the Segunda División B champion. The two losing semifinalists entered the playoff round for the last two promotion spots.

The four group runners-up were drawn against one of the three fourth-placed teams outside their group while the four third-placed teams were drawn against each other in a two-legged series. The six winners advanced with the two losing semifinalists to determine the four teams that entered the last two-legged series for the last two promotion spots. In all the playoff series, the lower-ranked club played at home first. Whenever there was a tie in position (e.g. like the group winners in the Semifinal Round and Final or the third-placed teams in the first round), a draw determined the club to play at home first.

Group Winners promotion play-off

Qualified teams 
The draw were held in the RFEF headquarters, in Las Rozas (Madrid), on 11 May 2009, 16:30 CEST.

Matches

Semifinals

|}
The aggregate winners will be promoted and qualified to the 2009–10 Segunda División B Final. The aggregate losers will be relegated to the Non–champions Promotion Play–off Second Round.

First leg

Second leg

Final

|}

First leg

Second leg

Non-champions promotion play-off

First round

Qualified teams

Matches

|}

Second round

Qualified teams

Matches

|}

Third round

Qualified teams

Matches

|}

Relegation play-off

Qualified teams

Matches

|}

External links
Segunda División play-off 2008-09 on Futbolme.com

Segunda División B play-offs
1
play